Ogcocephalus nasutus, the shortnose batfish, is a species of fish in the anglerfish genus in the batfish family Ogcocephalidae.

The fish is found in the Western Atlantic Ocean and the Caribbean.

References

Ogcocephalidae
Taxa named by Georges Cuvier 
Fish described in 1829
Fish of the Atlantic Ocean